A filakto is an Eastern Christian sacramental that is pinned to one's clothing in order to ward off Satan. Always adorned with a Christian cross, they are usually made by monastics, who fill them with blessed palms, cotton soaked in holy anointing oil, wax from candles burned upon a church's altar, or dirt from the grave of a saint. Filakato can be edged with small beads or made of cloth.

See also 
Cross necklace
Christian prayer beads

References 

Sacramentals